Helvella semiobruta is a species of fungus in the family Helvellaceae. Originally found in the country of France, it was described as new to science in 1976. It has also been collected in Greece, and Cyprus, where it grows in maquis shrubland.

References

Further reading

External links

semiobruta
Fungi described in 1976
Fungi of Europe